The 2012 Women's VISA International Hockey Tournament was a women's field hockey tournament, consisting of a series of test matches. It was held in London, United Kingdom, from May 2 to 6, 2012. The tournament served as a test event for the field hockey tournament at the 2012 Summer Olympics. The tournament featured four of the top nations in women's field hockey.

Great Britain won the tournament after defeating Argentina 2–0 in the final. South Korea finished in third place after defeating China 3–2 in the third place playoff.

Competition format
The tournament featured the national teams of Argentina, China, South Korea, and the hosts, Great Britain, competing in a round-robin format, with each team playing each other once. Three points were awarded for a win, one for a draw, and none for a loss.

* Includes results representing England.

Results

Pool stage

Classification matches

Third and fourth place

Final

Statistics

Final standings

Goalscorers

References

Field hockey